Ace Rusevski (born November 30, 1956 in Kumanovo) is a retired Macedonian boxer, who represented Yugoslavia at the 1976 Summer Olympics in Montreal, Quebec, Canada. There he won the bronze medal in the lightweight division (– 60 kg) after being defeated in the semifinals by eventual gold medalist Howard Davis Jr. of the United States.

Professional career
Rusevski turned pro in 1981 and had limited success.  He never fought for a major title and retired in 1987 with a career record of 18-2-3 with 8 KO's.

Amateur career 
1977 - European Championships, Halle, Germany: Gold Medal (Lightweight)
1978 - World Championships, Belgrade, Yugoslavia: (Lightweight)
Defeated Jouko Moilanen (Finland) RSC 2
Lost to Davidson Andeh (Nigeria) RSCI 2
1979 - Mediterranean Games, Split, Yugoslavia: Gold medal (Light-welterweight)

Olympic Results
1976 - Olympic Games, Montreal, Canada: Bronze Medal (Lightweight)
Round of 64: Defeated Gerard Hamill (Ireland) by decision, 4-1
Round of 32: Defeated Roberto Andino (Puerto Rico) RSC 3
Round of 16: Defeated Reinaldo Valiente (Cuba) by decision, 5-0
Quarterfinal: Defeated Yves Jeudy (Haiti) RSC 2
Semifinal: Lost to Howard Davis, Jr. (United States) by decision, 0-5 (was awarded bronze medal) 
1980 - Olympic Games, Moscow, Soviet Union: (Light-welterweight)
Defeated Margarit Anastasov  (Bulgaria) 4-1
Defeated Boualem Bel Alouane (Algeria) 5-0
Lost to Patrizio Oliva (Italy) 2-3

References
 databaseOlympics
 Profile in Serbian OLympic Committee
 

1956 births
Living people
Sportspeople from Kumanovo
Macedonian male boxers
Lightweight boxers
Boxers at the 1976 Summer Olympics
Boxers at the 1980 Summer Olympics
Olympic boxers of Yugoslavia
Olympic bronze medalists for Yugoslavia
Olympic medalists in boxing
Yugoslav male boxers
Medalists at the 1976 Summer Olympics
Competitors at the 1979 Mediterranean Games
Mediterranean Games gold medalists for Yugoslavia
Mediterranean Games medalists in boxing